Deception Station is an Argentine antarctic base located at Deception Island, South Shetland Islands.

History 

The station was founded on January 25, 1948, and was a year-round station until December 1967 when volcanic eruptions forced the evacuation of the base. Since then it is inhabited only during the summer.

The island suffered severe volcanic eruptions in 1967, 1969 and 1970.

In 1950 a seismograph was installed in the base, and in 1951 it also received ionospheric equipment. In 1993 a volcano observatory was opened.

Climate

See also
 Gabriel de Castilla Base
 List of Antarctic research stations
 List of Antarctic field camps

References

External links 

 Base Decepción at Marambio.aq
 Sito ufficiale Direcciòn Nacional del Antartico
 COMNAP Antarctic Facilities 
 COMNAP Antarctic Facilities Map

Decepcion
Deception Island
Deception
1948 establishments in Antarctica